Galgenlieder is a collection of poems by Christian Morgenstern. Following ten years of writing work, it was first published in March 1905 by Bruno Cassirer.

Poems
 Titelansage
 Motto. Dem Kinde Im Manne
 Versuch Einer Einleitung
 Wie Die Galgenlieder Entstanden
 Lass Die Molekuele Rasen
 Bundeslied Der Galgenbrueder
 Galgenbruders Lied an Sophie, Die Henkersmaid
 Nein!
 Das Gebet
 Das Grosse Lalula
 Der Zwoelf-Elf
 Das Mondschaf
 Lunovis
 Der Rabe Ralf
 Fisches Nachtgesang
 Galgenbruders Fruehlingslied
 Das Hemmed
 Das Problem
 Neue Bildungen, Der Natur Vorgeschlagen
 Die Trichter
 Der Tanz
 Das Knie
 Der Seufzer
 Bim, Bam, Bum
 Das Aesthetische Wiesel
 Der Schaukelstuhl Auf Der Verlassenen Terrasse
 Die Beichte Des Wurms
 Das Weiblein Mit Der Kunkel
 Die Mitternachtsmaus
 Himmel Und Erde
 Der Walfafisch Oder Das ueberwasser
 Mondendinge
 Die Schildkroete
 Der Hecht
 Der Nachtschelm Und Das Siebenschwein
 Die Beiden Esel
 Der Steinochs
 Tapetenblume
 Das Wasser
 Die Luft
 Wer Denn?
 Der Lattenzaun
 Die Beiden Flaschen
 Das Lied Vom Blonden Korken
 Der Wuerfel
 Kronpraetendenten
 Die Weste
 Philanthropisch
 Der Mond
 Die Westkuesten
 Unter Zeiten
 Unter Schwarzkuenstlern
 Der Traum Der Magd
 Zaezilie
 Das Nasobem
 Anto-Logie
 Die Hysterix
 Die Probe
 Im Jahre 19000
 Der Gaul
 Der Heroische Pudel
 Das Huhn, Moewenlied
 Igel Und Agel
 Der Werwolf
 Die Fingur
 Das Fest Des Wuestlings
 Km 21
 Geiss Und Schleiche
 Der Purzelbaum
 Die Zwei Wurzeln
 Das Geburtslied Oder Die Zeichen
 Galgenkindes Wiegenlied
 Wie Sich Das Galgenkind Die Montasnamen Merkt
 Galgenberg

English translations
The Gallows Songs. Christian Morgenstern's Galgenlieder, translated by Max Knight (University of California Press, 1964).
Gallows Songs, translated by W.D. Snodgrass and Lore Segal (Michigan Press, 1967).
Songs from the Gallows: Galgenlieder, translated by Walter Arndt (Yale University Press, 1993).
Lullabies, Lyrics and Gallows Songs, translated by Anthea Bell with illustrations by Lisbeth Zwerger (North South Books, 1995).
A number of these poems were translated into English by Jerome Lettvin with explanations of Morgensterns wordplay methods and their relationship to Lewis Carroll's methods. These were published in a journal called The Fat Abbot in the Fall Winter 1962 edition, along with an essay illuminating subtle characteristics of the originals.

Selected translations

Visual poems
"Fisches Nachtgesang" ("Fish's Night Song") consists only of patterns of macrons and breves printed to suggest fish scales or ripples.

Musical settings
Galgenlieder, six songs by Hanns Eisler 1917
Galgenlieder a 5, cycle of 14 songs by Sofia Gubaidulina (b.1931)
Galgenlieder, 10 songs for mezzo and trio by Anders Brødsgaard (b.1955) 
Galgenlieder, Op. 129, 8 songs for soprano' harp and tuba by Jan Koetsier (1911-2006) 
Galgenlieder, chamber composition by Jacqueline Fontyn (b.1930)
Galgenlieder, five song cycle by Siegfried Strohbach for male choir a cappella.
Galgenlieder, five songs "Mondendinge" ; "Der Hecht" ; "Die Mitternachtsmaus" ; "Das Wasser" ; "Galgenkindes Wiegenlied", by Vincent Bouchot (b.1966)

References

1905 poems